Peter [de] Thellusson (27 June 1735 — 21 July 1797) was a Genevan businessman and banker who settled in London, and became a British subject in 1762. He amassed a fortune through commerce and, when he died in 1797, he owned more than 4,000 acres of land in England. His descendants built the new Brodsworth Hall in South Yorkshire, which is maintained by  English Heritage.

Thellusson was a member of a Huguenot family which had fled France for Geneva in the 16th century. His father Isaac had started a bank in Geneva (Thellusson, Necker et Cie) and became the Genevan ambassador to Paris. Peter, with the help of his brother George-Tobie, managed the successful bank in partnership with Jacques Necker, the Thellussons managing the London branch of the bank from 1760 with Necker managing the Paris branch. Both partners became very rich by loans to the treasury and speculation in grain. On 6 January 1760 he married Ann, daughter of Matthew Woodford and sister of Sir Ralph Woodford of Carlby, Lincolnshire. Peter started his own finance house in Philpot Lane and in 1761 took British nationality by Act of Parliament.

He was also involved in other businesses, becoming a director of the Bank of England, part owner of several sugar refineries, and an importer of tobacco and sugar from the West Indies. This role saw him provide loans to slave ship and plantation owners. As these slave owners defaulted on debts, Thellusson amassed interests in Caribbean plantations. The Thellussons continued to own slaves in Grenada and Montserrat until 1820. Thellusson built a large house for himself 'Plaistow Lodge' at Bromley in Kent (Now Bromley Parish CofE Primary School) and in 1790 bought the Brodsworth estate in South Yorkshire (The existing Victorian building was erected in 1861 for Charles Sabine Thellusson, but the original estate was constructed in 1791 for Peter Thellusson. House and gardens now belonging to English Heritage).

After his death his substantial estate was embroiled in the Thellusson Will Case, as he had written an unusual will whereby his fortune and estates were put into a trust fund for the benefit of future generations at the expense of his children and grandchildren. The two ultimate beneficiaries, decided by the courts after protracted legal wrangling, were the grandchildren of his eldest son Peter Isaac Thelluson, who was created Baron Rendlesham in 1806 and one of his other sons, Charles. It is believed that the Thellusson Will case provided the basis for the fictional case of Jarndyce and Jarndyce in Charles Dickens' novel Bleak House. Thelluson may also be the inspiration for the Tellsons Bank mentioned in Dickens' A Tale of Two Cities. As a result of the case, legislation, commonly known as the Thellusson Act, was passed to prevent a recurrence of such problems in the future.

Notes

Bankers from the Republic of Geneva
1737 births
1797 deaths
18th-century British businesspeople
British slave owners
Plantation owners